Sevenia natalensis, the Natal tree nymph, is a butterfly in the family Nymphalidae found in southeastern Africa.

Wingspan: 40–48 mm.

Flight period year round, peaking between February and May.

Larvae feed of Sapium reticulatum and Sapium integerrimum.

References

natalensis
Butterflies described in 1847
Butterflies of Africa